Scandaroon or Scanderoon is an archaic English language name for:
 the city of İskenderun in Turkey, and things named after it, including
 the Scandaroon pigeon, and;
 a board game, Scandaroon.